Epyc is a brand of multi-core x86-64 microprocessors designed and sold by AMD, based on the company's Zen microarchitecture. Introduced in June 2017, they are specifically targeted for the server and embedded system markets. Epyc processors share the same microarchitecture as their regular desktop-grade counterparts, but have enterprise-grade features such as higher core counts, more PCI Express lanes, support for larger amounts of RAM, and larger cache memory. They also support multi-chip and dual-socket system configurations by using the Infinity Fabric interconnect.

History 
In March 2017, AMD announced plans to re-enter the server market with a platform based on the Zen microarchitecture, codenamed Naples, and officially revealed it under the brand name Epyc in May. That June, AMD officially launched Epyc 7001 series processors, offering up to 32 cores per socket, and enabling performance that allowed Epyc to be competitive with the competing Intel Xeon product line. Two years later, in August 2019, the Epyc 7002 'Rome' series processors, based on the Zen 2 microarchitecture, launched, doubling the core count per socket to 64, and increasing per-core performance dramatically over the last generation architecture.

In March 2021, AMD launched the Epyc 7003 'Milan' series, based on the Zen 3 microarchitecture. Epyc Milan brought the same 64 cores as Epyc Rome, but with much higher per-core performance, with the EPYC 7763 beating the EPYC 7702 by up to 22% despite having the same number of cores and threads. A refresh of the Epyc 7003 'Milan' series with 3D V-Cache named Milan-X launched on March 21, 2022, using the same cores as Epyc Milan, but with an additional 512MB of cache stacked onto the compute dies, bringing the total amount of cache per CPU to 768 MB.

On November 8, 2021, AMD unveiled the upcoming generations of AMD EPYC, also unveiling the new LGA-6096 SP5 socket that would support the upcoming generations of Epyc chips. Codenamed Genoa, the first Zen 4 based Epyc CPUs will be built on TSMC's N5 node and support up to 96 cores and 192 threads per socket, alongside 12 channels of DDR5, 128 PCIe 5.0 lanes, and Compute Express Link 1.1. AMD also shared information regarding the sister-chip of Genoa, codenamed Bergamo. Bergamo will be based on a modified Zen 4 microarchitecture named Zen 4c, designed to allow for much higher core counts and efficiency at the cost of lower single-core performance, targeting cloud providers and workloads, compared to traditional high performance computing workloads. Bergamo will be compatible with Socket SP5, and will support up to 128 cores and 256 threads per socket.

On November 10th, 2022, AMD officially launched EPYC Genoa, Many tech reviewers and customers had already received hardware for testing and benchmarking, and third party benchmarks of Genoa parts were immediately available. The flagship part, the Epyc 9654, set records for multi core performance, and showed up to 4x performance compared to Intel's flagship part, the Xeon 8380. High memory bandwidth and extensive PCIe connectivity removed many bottlenecks, allowing all 96 cores to be utilized in workloads where previous generation Milan chips would have been IO bound. Genoa was also the first x86 server CPU to support CXL, allowing for further expansion of memory and other devices with a high bandwidth interface built on PCIe 5.0.

AMD Epyc CPU codenames follow the naming scheme of Italian cities, including Milan, Rome and Naples.

Design 

Epyc CPUs use a multi-chip-module design to enable higher yields for a CPU than traditional monolithic dies. First gen Epyc CPUs are composed of four 14 nm compute dies, each with up to 8 cores. Cores are symmetrically disabled on dies to create lower binned products with fewer cores but the same I/O and memory footprint. Second and Third gen Epyc CPUs are composed of eight compute dies built on a 7 nm process node, and a large I/O die built on a 14 nm process node. Third gen Milan-X CPUs use advanced through-silicon-vias to stack an additional die on top of each of the 8 compute dies, adding 64 MB of L3 cache per die. 

Epyc supports both single socket and dual socket operation. In a dual socket configuration, 64 PCIe lanes from each CPU are allocated to AMD's proprietary Infinity Fabric interconnect to allow for full bandwidth between both CPUs. Thus, a dual socket configuration has the same number of usable PCIe lanes as a single socket configuration. First generation Epyc CPUs had 128 PCIe 3.0 lanes, while second and third generation had 128 PCIe 4.0 lanes. All current Epyc CPUs are equipped with up to eight channels of DDR4 at varying speeds, though next gen Genoa CPUs are confirmed by AMD to support up to twelve channels of DDR5.

Unlike Opteron, Intel equivalents and AMD's desktop processors (excluding Socket AM1), Epyc processors are chipset-free - also known as system on a chip. That means most features required to make servers fully functional (such as memory, PCI Express, SATA controllers, etc.) are fully integrated into the processor, eliminating the need for a chipset to be placed on the mainboard. Some features may require the use of additional controller chips to utilize.

Reception 
Initial reception to Epyc was generally positive. Epyc was generally found to outperform Intel CPUs in cases where the cores could work independently, such as in high-performance computing and big-data applications. First generation Epyc fell behind in database tasks compared to Intel's Xeon parts due to higher cache latency. In 2021, Meta Platforms selected Epyc chips for its metaverse data centers.

Epyc Genoa was well received, as it offered incredible performance and efficiency compared to previous offerings, though received some criticism for not having 2 DIMMs per channel configurations validating, with some reviewers calling it an "incomplete platform".

Features

Products

Server

First generation Epyc (Naples) 
The following table lists the devices using the first generation design.

A "P" suffix denotes support for only a single socket configuration. Non-P models use 64 PCIe lanes from each processor for the communication between processors.

Second generation Epyc (Rome) 

In November 2018, AMD announced Epyc 2 at their Next Horizon event, the second generation of Epyc processors codenamed "Rome" and based on the Zen 2 microarchitecture. The processors feature up to eight 7 nm-based "chiplet" processors with a 14 nm-based IO chip providing 128 PCIe 4.0 lanes in the center interconnected via Infinity Fabric. The processors support up to 8 channels of DDR4 RAM up to 4 TB, and introduce support for PCIe 4.0. These processors have up to 64 cores with 128 SMT threads per socket. The 7nm "Rome" is manufactured by TSMC. It was released on August 7, 2019.

Third generation Epyc (Milan) 
At the HPC-AI Advisory Council in the United Kingdom in October 2019, AMD stated specifications for Milan, Epyc chips based on the Zen 3 microarchitecture. Milan chips will use Socket SP3, with up to 64 cores on package, and support eight-channel DDR4 RAM and 128 PCIe 4.0 lanes. It also announced plans for the subsequent generation of chips, codenamed Genoa, that will be based on the Zen 4 microarchitecture and use Socket SP5.

Milan CPUs were launched by AMD on March 15, 2021.

Milan-X CPUs were launched March 21, 2022. Milan-X CPUs use 3D V-Cache technology to increase the maximum L3 cache per socket capacity from 256 MB to 768 MB.

Fourth generation Epyc (Genoa) 
On November 10, 2022, AMD launched the fourth generation of Epyc server and data center processors based on the Zen 4 microarchitecture, codenamed Genoa. At their launch event, AMD announced that Microsoft and Google would be some of Genoa's customers. Genoa features between 16 and 96 cores with support for PCIe 5.0 and DDR5. There was also an emphasis by AMD on Genoa's energy efficiency, which according to AMD CEO Lisa Su, means "lower total cost of ownership" for enterprise and cloud datacenter clients. Genoa uses AMD's new SP5 (LGA-6096) socket.

Embedded

First generation Epyc (Snowy Owl) 
In February 2018, AMD also announced the EPYC 3000 series of embedded Zen CPUs.

Chinese variants 

A variant created for the Chinese server market by an AMD–Chinese joint venture is the Hygon Dhyana system on a chip. It is noted to be a variant of the AMD Epyc, and is so similar that "there is little to no differentiation between the chips". It has been noted that there is "less than 200 lines of new kernel code" for Linux kernel support, and that the Dhyana is "mostly a re-branded Zen CPU for the Chinese server market". Later Benchmarks showed that certain floating point instructions are performing worse and AES is disabled, probably to comply with US export restrictions. Cryptography extensions are replaced by Chinese variants.

References 

AMD x86 microprocessors
Computer-related introductions in 2017